Naluki may refer to:
 Naluki, Dalgan
 Naluki, Zahedan